Paul Mack (December 17, 1891 – January 1979) was an American Negro league third baseman in the 1910s.

A native of Charleston, South Carolina, Mack played for the Bacharach Giants in 1916 and 1917. He died in Charleston in 1979 at age 87.

References

External links
Baseball statistics and player information from Baseball-Reference Black Baseball Stats and Seamheads

1891 births
1979 deaths
Date of death missing
Bacharach Giants players
Baseball third basemen
Baseball players from South Carolina
Sportspeople from Charleston, South Carolina
20th-century African-American sportspeople